Krpa or KRPA may refer to
KRPA, a commercial radio station based in Oak Harbor, Washington, U.S.
Kripa (Kṛpa in IAST transliteration), a character in Sanskrit epics of ancient India
Milorad Pavlović-Krpa (1865–1957), Serbian writer, publicist, translator and editor